Cécile Duflot (born 1 April 1975) is a French non-governmental organisation (NGO) leader and former politician.  She has been a government minister and political party leader.

She was Minister of Territorial Equality and Housing in the Ayrault Cabinet. Until June 2012, she was Party Secretary (i.e. leader) of Europe Ecology – The Greens, a position she held from November 2006 and was, with Jean-Luc Bennahmias, the only Green leader to have served two consecutive terms. In May 2012 she announced her resignation from this role.

On 5 April 2018, she announced her departure from politics to lead Oxfam France starting on 15 June.

Personal life 
Duflot was born in Villeneuve-Saint-Georges, Val-de-Marne, the eldest daughter of a railway unionist and a physics and chemistry teacher (who was herself also a unionist). Duflot spent her childhood and adolescence in the district of Montereau-Fault-Yonne before returning to her native town, Villeneuve-Saint-Georges, in the early 1990s. She is a town planner by profession, a graduate of the ESSEC Business School (French Business School), and holds a master's degree in geography.

Her first activist commitments were in the Jeunesse ouvrière chrétienne ("Young Christian Workers") and the Ligue pour la protection des oiseaux ("Birds' Protection League").

A divorcée, Cécile Duflot is the mother of three girls and a boy in a step-family. Also, she shared the life of Jean-Vincent Placé, a French Senator and once Secretary of State.

Political career 

After joining The Greens in 2001, she stood in the municipal elections at Villeneuve-Saint-Georges that same year. She became an opposition municipal councillor in the town in June 2004.

In 2003, she joined the electoral college of the Greens; she organised the acquisition of their national headquarters. She became spokesperson for the party in January 2005. That same year on World Water Day, she swam in the Seine in Paris with three other members of the electoral college to denounce river pollution in France and to match Jacques Chirac's promise, when he was Mayor of Paris, to swim in the Seine.

On 16 November 2006 she was elected National Secretary of the Conseil National Inter Régional, succeeding Yann Wehrling. At the age of 31, she was the youngest-ever National Secretary of the Greens.

At the end of 2006, she stood for the party's primary to nominate its presidential candidate for the 2007 French presidential election. Earning 23.29% of the vote, she came third after Dominique Voynet and Yves Cochet, and did not qualify for the second round.

In the 2007 legislative elections, she was the Green Party candidate in the third district of Val-De-Marne and gained 3.55% of the vote.

In March 2008 during the municipal elections at Villeneuve-St-Georges, she came in second place on a unified ticket of the PS, the MRC, the PRG and the Greens after socialist Laurent Dutheil. The ticket earned 24.36%.

On 6 December 2008, introducing a motion synthesizing four of the six activists' voting slips three weeks earlier, she was re-offered the post of National Secretary of the Greens with 70.99% of the votes. With Jean-Luc Benhamias, she is the only secretary to be offered a second consecutive term, Dominique Plancke having completed three terms of one year.

During her first term, she worked to establish Europe Écologie for the European Elections of 2009. She is not eligible as a candidate for this now, preferring instead to focus on her mandate as National Secretary.

In 2010, she along with Monica Frassoni, Renate Künast, and Marina Silva were named by Foreign Policy magazine to its list of top global thinkers, for taking Green mainstream.

In August 2014, she voiced criticisms of the French government, particularly of President François Hollande, stating that, "...wanting to be a leftist president, he never found his social base nor his supporters. This is not a question of temperament, rather it is the result of a succession of often unexpected choices, which are sometimes inconsistent with each other."

She is a member of the Advisory Panel of DiEM25

As Minister 

The position of Minister of Housing was offered to her in the Ayrault government of the Hollande presidency, which began in May 2012.  One of her tasks was to promulgate a law on social housing.  Her first effort, announced 11 September of that year,  failed in October, causing embarrassment to the Prime Minister.  The loi Duflot replaced the :fr:Loi Scellier on 18 January 2013.

The loi Alur (Accès au logement et urbanisme rénové) restricted landlord-tenant relations in exchange for favourable financial treatment.  It passed on 20 February 2014.

After politics
In June 2017 she was for the Green Party a candidate for Parliament. She was eliminated in the first round.

Since June 2018 she is the executive director of the NGO Oxfam France, member of the confederation Oxfam International.

She is a member of the board of Paris 1 Pantheon Sorbonne University for 2020-2024. 

On April 22, 2022, she was appointed by decree to the National Consultative Ethics Committee for Life Sciences and Health on the proposal of the Defender of Rights

Main political offices 

The French political system allows one person to hold multiple political offices.  The electoral promise of François Hollande to terminate what is known as Dual mandate has not, as of March 2014, been fulfilled.
 Minister of Territories Equality and Housing : May 2012 – March 2014.
 Deputy for the 6th electoral district of Paris : Since June 2012
 Regional councillor of Île-de-France, and chairwoman of the Europe Ecology – The Greens  Group : 2010–2012 (Resignation).
 Deputy-mayor of Villeneuve-Saint-Georges : 2008–2011 (Resignation).
 Municipal councillor of Villeneuve-Saint-Georges : Since 2004. Reelected in 2008.
 National Secretary of Europe Ecology – The Greens : 2006–2012 (Resignation).

References

Bibliography 
 Yves Frémion, History of the Green Revolution, published by Hoebeke, 2007, p. 395

External links 

  
  
  Cécile Duflot on the official Green Party site.
  Cécile Duflot's blog on the European Ecology site for the 2009 European elections.
  Housing and Accommodation   Official site for Minister of Territorial Equality and Housing.
   :fr:Ministère de l'Égalité des Territoires et du Logement

1975 births
Living people
Paris Diderot University alumni
ESSEC Business School alumni
Europe Ecology – The Greens politicians
Government ministers of France
People from Villeneuve-Saint-Georges
Politicians from Île-de-France
Women members of the National Assembly (France)
Deputies of the 14th National Assembly of the French Fifth Republic
21st-century French women politicians
Women government ministers of France
Women opposition leaders